Arakani is a rural locality (a selo) and the administrative center of Arakansky Selsoviet, Untsukulsky District, Republic of Dagestan, Russia. The population was 1,640 as of 2010. There are 23 streets.

Geography 
Arakani is located 26 km southeast of Shamilkala (the district's administrative centre) by road. Maydanskoye is the nearest rural locality.

References 

Rural localities in Untsukulsky District